The , which connects the island of Ōshima to the main part of Shikoku, was the world's longest suspension bridge structure when completed, in 1999. The bridge is part of the Shimanami Kaidō, an expressway that spans a series of islands and connects Hiroshima Prefecture in Honshū to Ehime Prefecture in Shikoku. The bridge and the expressway were both conceived by the Honshū-Shikoku Bridge Project.

Construction

The Kurushima Kaikyō Bridge consists of three successive suspension bridges with six towers and four anchorages. There is a shared anchorage that joins each suspension bridge to the next. Its construction is similar to the western portion of San Francisco–Oakland Bay Bridge which is two successive suspension bridges with four towers and one shared anchorage.

 , main span , ranks 63rd largest two tower suspension bridge
 , main span , ranks 26th largest
 , main span , ranks 25th largest

See also 
 Akashi Kaikyō Bridge
 Great Seto Bridge
 List of longest suspension bridge spans

Notes

External links 

 Kurushima Kaikyō Bridge home page
 Honshū-Shikoku Bridge Authority home page
 
 
 

Suspension bridges in Japan
Bridges completed in 1999
Buildings and structures in Ehime Prefecture
Roads in Ehime Prefecture
1999 establishments in Japan